Little David was the nickname of an American 36-inch (914 mm) caliber mortar designed to breach the Siegfried Line and then used for test-firing aerial bombs during World War II. With the same calibre as the British Mallet's Mortar, constructed in May 1857, it is one of the largest-calibre guns ever built, having a larger calibre than both of Germany's Schwerer Gustav and Dora which were  railway guns.

History
The mortar was developed as an extension of a previous proposal to destroy heavy concrete fortifications such as the Siegfried Line with massive plastic explosive charges delivered by rocket or bomb. During a discussion between representatives of the Ballistic Research Laboratory and the Office of the Chief of Ordnance it was suggested that instead of dropping such a charge from an airplane, it could be fired from a mortar. Development began of a 914 mm siege mortar firing a 3,600 lb shell. The mortar's base was a large steel box that was placed below ground, with its top flush with the surrounding surface, allowing the mortar's muzzle to be lowered horizontal for loading at ground level.

After the Siegfried Line was breached with conventional forces, Little David was instead considered for use against the extremely strong fortifications during the expected invasion of Japan. The decision was made to test for this purpose, but the end of the war also removed all need for Little David to be deployed. The mortar was able to be transported as a two-piece mobile unit, consisting of the  barrel and the  base transported by two M25 tractors. In addition to the two main loads, the Little David unit would also include a bulldozer and crane with bucket to dig the emplacement for the mortar's base.

The huge mortar could be ready to fire in 12 hours.

Little David was by calibre one of the largest artillery pieces ever produced, although Dora fired a heavier shell. Little David's overall effectiveness would have been questionable because of its limited range and accuracy. When Japan surrendered, the invasion became unnecessary, and Little David (still in its trial phase) never saw combat.

With the closure of the Aberdeen Proving Ground Ordnance Museum and relocation to Fort Lee, the status of Little David is currently unknown as only restored pieces made the transfer.

See also 
List of heavy mortars
List of the largest cannon by caliber
Schwerer Gustav

References

Notes

Sources

External links

 newsreel from the Army Pictorial Service
 globalsecurity.org - 36-inch Little David
Little David Mortar Present day photos of the Little David Mortar at Aberdeen Proving Grounds, MD

Mortars of the United States
World War II mortars
Trial and research firearms of the United States
914 mm artillery
Individual cannons
Military equipment introduced from 1940 to 1944
Articles containing video clips
Japan campaign